Löffingen is a town in the district Breisgau-Hochschwarzwald, in Baden-Württemberg, Germany. It is situated 14 km southwest of Donaueschingen, and 40 km southeast of Freiburg.

Sons and daughters of the town
 Rene D Egle (born 1963) Area General Manager & Member of the 2004 Peking to Berlin Tour on classic motorbikes
 Wolfgang Zinser (born 1964) former German champion in the triple jump
 Tutilo Burger Benedictine OSB (Ordo Sancti Benedicti)  (born 1965 in Seppenhofen), Religious Order and Archbishop of the  Benedictine Abbey Beuron
 Martin Braun (born 1968), football player and coach
 Markus Schuler (born 1977), football player (Hannover, Bielefeld)

References

Breisgau-Hochschwarzwald
Baden